Francisco Romero Arribas (born December 24, 1959) is a Guatemalan sport shooter. He competed in skeet shooting events at the Summer Olympics in 1976, 1980, 1984, 1992, and 1996.

Olympic results

References

1959 births
Living people
Skeet shooters
Guatemalan male sport shooters
Shooters at the 1976 Summer Olympics
Shooters at the 1980 Summer Olympics
Shooters at the 1984 Summer Olympics
Shooters at the 1992 Summer Olympics
Shooters at the 1996 Summer Olympics
Olympic shooters of Guatemala
Pan American Games medalists in shooting
Pan American Games bronze medalists for Guatemala
Shooters at the 1995 Pan American Games
20th-century Guatemalan people
21st-century Guatemalan people